Vinterland may refer to

Vinterland (film), Norwegian 2007 film
Vinterland (album), 2014 Sarah Dawn Finer Christmas album, or the title track
"Vinterland", a 2020 song by Laleh

See also
Hej, mitt vinterland, 1963 Lena Conradson Christmas song
Winterland (disambiguation)